Michael McKenzie (born 1953 in New York, United States) is an American artist and writer. His mother a fourth generation Irish/German and his father of recent Scottish immigrants. He began writing, drawing, painting and publishing at a young age, his first publication, at age 5, was Two Cents Plain, a four-page magazine (selling for 2 cents) he made using a mimeograph machine at his father's office. A fluke meeting at the 1964 World's Fair with his grandmother introduced him to Philip Johnson, Andy Warhol and Robert Indiana, all three of whom he would later work with.

McKenzie studied creative writing at Middlebury College, Columbia, The New School and Brooklyn College under five Pulitzer Prize Winners Mark Strand, Charles Simic, Anthony Hecht, John Gardner, John Ashbery taking multiple degrees. While in school he founded the literary & art magazine Undine with a board of directors that included NY Times Executive Editor Harvey Shapiro, Larry Rivers and Tennessee Williams.

He took up journalism mainly under the mentorship of Shapiro and Truman Capote who encouraged him to pursue that artform "because if you want to know what great artists are really like they can fool you with media stories and awards but not with their eyes". To that end he interviewed and/or photographed a wide portfolio of artists who interested him including Capote, Williams, Albee, Warhol, Rivers, Nureyev, Lou Reed, The Ramones, Blondie, Madonna; such leading sports figures as Ali, Jordan and Namath and a wide scope of comedians including Carlin, Klein, Murray, Belushi, Radner, Joan Rivers, and Phyllis Diller. He paid his way through college and grad school as a portrait photographer and added silkscreening when he worked on a portrait project with Andy Warhol who introduced him to that print making/painting form. He took his MFA under John Ashbery and, on the advice of comedian George Carlin who he had interviewed and photographed, wrote his first book and the first on the television show Saturday Night Live! while still in school. He followed that up with successful titles on Madonna ["Lucky Star" Contemporary/MacMillan Books] and "Billy Joel: Piano Man [Ballantine Books], the first books on both of those artists. Collectively, his titles have sold over 1,000,000 copies and been published on five continents in 12 languages.

Writings
 Undine: A Journal of Art and Literature
 "Backstage at Saturday Night Live"
 "Billy Joel, [Ballantine Books, 1984].
 "Lucky Star: The Madonna Story, Contemporary Books, 1985.  [Also Basis of ABC-TV show]
 "New, Used, and Improved: Art for the Eighties, Abbeville, 1987. 
 "Sexy Legs [Putnam Books 1988] [also a Fox-TV show]
 "Teen Fitness [Scholastic Books 1989]
 "Larry Rivers: Prints and Multiples [Museum Books 1991]
 "Madonna, the Early Days: 65 Classic Photographs, Worldwide Televideo Enterprises (New York), 1993. 
 "Robert Indiana: American Dream  [MFA Books, 1995] with Robert Creeley	
 "Dark Poetics: The Art of Donald Sultan [MFA Books, 1997]
 "Popular Art in America [Fotofolio, 2003]
 "The Metropolitan {with Philip Johnson} [Fotofolio 2005]
 "Meadowcraft: A Hampton’s Classic [Fotofolio 2008]
 "Robert Indiana A – Z [AI Books 2013]

Art
McKenzie's clients included Time Inc, Rolling Stone, Sony, Playboy, Flemington Furs, Halston, Random House, Putnam Books, Ballantine Books, Scholastic, Stern, Der Spiegel, Scholastic, Harpers Bazaar, Coca-Cola, Nike, NBC, CBS, Paris Match and numerous other corporate, advertising, book and periodical clients. His studio was constantly working and, like one of his influences, Andy Warhol, there was no separation between his art and his commercial work. In 1978 he was named "Upcoming Photographer of the Year" by Art Direction Magazine. For several years he oil painted photographs and in 1978, when he met and worked with Warhol, realized that Andy's silkscreen technique converting photography to painting was what he was after. From 1977 – 1985 McKenzie had over 20 one man shows on four continents. In 1979 he curated the notorious 'Punk Art Show' which featured his portraits of Sid Vicious, Joey Ramone and Blondie and included original works by Joey Ramone, Chris Stein, Arturo Vega and John Holmstrom, founder of Punk Magazine. In 1981/83 he created a portfolio called 'Androgyny' which included early portraits of the then Androgynous Madonna as well as downtown performers John Sex, Bush Tetras and Michael Alago. He decided to 'make the portfolio come alive' and created a Kurt Weill-like cabaret act with the people from the portfolio. Titled 'Androgyny Cabaret' it played in numerous downtown NYC venues and was the subject of a two-hour documentary by the BBC which included a live guest appearance by members of the Clash.

By 1987 his silkscreen works attracted the attention of other artists and he began publishing works by numerous important painters using silkscreen techniques he mastered over the course of a decade. From this, American Image, his studio was born. He continued to show his portraits mainly in NY, Miami and Asia and is currently working on a book of his portraits and stories titled MAD GENIUSES: ANDY WARHOL AND HIS CIRCLE.

Publishing
McKenzie founded American Image Art in 1977 with photography and painting but after ten years of working in silkscreen, largely photography driven, the focus switched to screen printing with the desire to take techniques Warhol used to the next level. In pursuit of creating ultimate ‘silkscreen paintings’ he began as always with his own work then found the perfect foil for his silkscreen painting concept with Larry Rivers, an artist he admired since he was a teen. Perhaps the most true painter of his generation, Rivers’ work provided a true test for McKenzie's silkscreen vision and the first editioned piece they did, Golden Tales, required 53 proofs along with hand oil painting by Rivers on each print in the edition. The work was showcased at the then leading edge Chicago Art Fair and its size – 40” x 58” – along with its complexity and hand oil painting took printmaking to another level. Concurrently, a series of works on canvas were made which were further hand articulated and sold out on 57th Street in NYC.  American Image went on to do many important editions with Rivers in mediums ranging from massive screen prints to and this focus on a single artist became signatory to the studio.

From 1992 – 1998, McKenzie was American Curator for The Museum of Modern Art in São Paulo, Brazil, as well as for Museum of Contemporary Art and Museum of Modern Art in Rio de Janeiro for which he created exhibitions and portfolios titled “American Masters”. Over the course of six years the exhibitions included works by Warhol, Wesselmann, Katz, Stella, Rivers, Pasche, Oldenburg, Indiana and numerous others. “I did this” he told Globo Network, “because there was a cultural embargo which required service to the American Government for an artist to be approved for export to Brazil, thus preventing the essential American Artists from showing. These shows, which were blessed by Washington and funded by Varig and H. Stern, brought real American Art to Brazil and opened up Brazilians to show here as well. I try not to curate but when I see something radically missing I’m lured into it.” McKenzie also curated the show that helped move Miami's Bass Museum into contemporary in 1988 as well as important shows for The Nassau County Museum, Norton Museum, Boca Raton Museum and The Detroit Jewish Museum. He is currently working on a major book/travelling exhibition of WORD ART to include Indiana, Ruscha, Kruger and numerous others. “Again”, he stated, “I just see a cultural hole ignoring this as a critical movement in art which no one seems to fill in. It’s a link between poetry and art and these two creative forms have always been central to art history and to my life, so I’m lured into curating once again.”

Over the course of 35 plus years American Image has published a Who's Who of American Contemporary art including Warhol, Wesselman, Indiana, Oldenburg, Lichtenstein, D’Arcangelo, Katz, Sultan, Haring, Cutrone, Rivers, Paschke, Bell, Borofsky, Stella and recent works with what he calls Urban Pop: Crash, English, AIko, Eaton and Witz. In 2007 the studio embarked on a worldwide project with Pop Artist Robert Indiana to follow up his masterpiece LOVE with THE word for the new millennium. Indiana chose HOPE and it became a seminal part of Barack Obama's Presidential campaign, ultimately raising 7 figures as well as consciousness and votes. In 2010, The Today Show featured the story on HOPE declaring HOPE THE word for the next generation. A travelling Museum show of the works created by the studio with Indiana opened in Fall 2013 at The Munson Williams Proctor Museum, where Indiana first studied Art, and will travel through 2016 toured by Landau Travelling Exhibitions.

Lawsuit

As reported in an article in The New York Times by Graham Bowley on January 18, 2019 (His Art, Their Ideas: Did Robert Indiana Lose Control of His Work?), The Morgan Art Foundation, a for-profit entity, has accused Michael McKenzie, American Image Art and Jamie Thomas of taking advantage of Robert Indiana's advance age and isolation on a remote island off the coast of Maine to produce a bunch of inauthentic works that they sold under Mr. Indiana's name.  The lawsuit was filed in the United States District Court Southern District of New York.   Case 1:18-cv-04438-AT.

On August 21, 2019 the Supreme Court ruled that American Image would be the exclusive publishers, producers and dealers for Hope, which Michael McKenzie created in 2007. Court Index No. 653809/19  Indiana himself wrote that McKenzie and American Image were his collaborators for the last decades of his life and those works have been the subject of four museum exhibitions.

References

Graham Bowley, His Art, Their Ideas:  Did Robert Indiana Lose Control of His Work?, New York Times, January 18, 2019

External links
 https://www.nytimes.com/2019/01/18/arts/design/robert-indiana-artist-legal-dispute.html
 Lucky Star
 robert-indiana-from-a-to-z
 robert-indianas-alphabet-icons
 Rock Icons
 Truman Capote Photo by Michael McKenzie

American artists
1953 births
Living people
Middlebury College alumni
Columbia University School of the Arts alumni
Artists from New York (state)
The New School alumni
Brooklyn College alumni
Writers from New York (state)